The WBSC World Rankings is a ranking system for national teams in baseball, softball, and baseball5. The teams of the member nations of the World Baseball Softball Confederation (WBSC), baseball's world governing body, are ranked based on their tournament results with the most successful teams being ranked highest. A point system is used, with points being awarded based on the results of WBSC-recognized international tournaments. Under the existing system, rankings are based on a team's performance over the last four years, with major international tournaments awarded a higher weighting compared to minor international and continental tournaments.

Five rankings are published by the WBSC, they are: Men's Baseball, Women's Baseball, Women's Softball, Men's Softball, and Baseball5.

History 

In January 2009, the International Baseball Federation (IBAF) first published a listing in rank order of its member associations to provide a basis for comparison of the relative strengths of these teams. Though primarily focused on the respective men's senior teams of member nations, the current ranks also include points awarded based on results at the IBAF 'AAA' (Under 18) Junior and 'AA' (Under 16) Youth Championships held during the tracking period. As a result from the merger with softball in 2013, the WBSC is also responsible for ranking international men's and women's softball teams. Beginning in 2015, the rankings also determine which twelve teams participate in the WBSC Premier12 tournament.

Men's

Baseball

Men's ranking leaders 
 WBSC World Men's Ranking Leaders

The latest rankings of March 2020 saw a record 86 nations earning rankings.

Best Movers

Softball

Women's

Softball

Women's ranking leaders  
 WBSC World Women's Ranking Leaders

Softball saw a ranking featuring 69 countries in March 2020.

Best Movers

Baseball  

In the wake of the International Olympic Committee's decision to cut baseball from the 2012 Olympics program, the IBAF pushed the growth of women's baseball as to include a women's component in its bid for a reinstatement of the sport in future Olympics. The effort to unify the sports resulted in the merger of the IBAF with the International Softball Federation in 2013 to create the WBSC. 

The initial women's baseball rankings were based upon results from past Women's Baseball World Cups. While the calculations of the women's rankings are similar to that of the men's, one main difference is that they are inclusive of the three most recent IBAF Women's Baseball World Cups whereas the men's rankings only include the last two. Points are weighted in favor of the more recent results.

Coed

Baseball5 
Baseball5 is a mixed-gender sport, with each team of 5 active players having at least 2 players of either gender.

Calculation method

Men's baseball
Points are awarded in the men's baseball rankings according to finishes in the Premier12, World Baseball Classic, U-23 Baseball World Cup, U-18 Baseball World Cup, U-15 Baseball World Cup and U-12 Baseball World Cup as follows.

Premier 12

World Baseball Classic

U-23 Baseball World Cup

U-18 Baseball World Cup

U-15 Baseball  World Cup

U-12 Baseball World Cup

See also

Notes and references

External links 
WBSC rankings

World Rankings
Sports world rankings